Walter Cox may refer to:

Walter Smith Cox (1826–1902), United States federal judge
Walter Cox (footballer, born 1849) (1849–1945), English football player and manager with Stoke City
Walter Cox (footballer, born 1863) (1863–?), Scottish football goalkeeper with Hibernian, Burnley and Everton
Walter Cox (footballer, born 1872) (1872–1930), English football goalkeeper with Southampton and Manchester City
Walter Alfred Cox (1862–1931), English printmaker and painter
Walter T. Cox III (born 1942), United States judge
Walter Cox (baseball) (died 2006), head coach of Clemson Tigers from 1948 to 1951 and president of Clemson University